Rubus arcticus, the Arctic bramble or Arctic raspberry, is a species of slow-growing bramble belonging to the rose family, found in arctic and alpine regions in the Northern Hemisphere.

Description 
Rubus arcticus grows most often in acidic soils rich in organic matter. The fruit is deep red or dark purple, with an unusual hardiness to frost and cold weather conditions.

Distribution and habitat 
It grows in Alaska, northern Scandinavia and Finland, Russia, Poland, Belarus, Mongolia, northeastern China, North Korea, Estonia, Lithuania, Canada, and the northern United States as far south as Oregon, Colorado, Michigan, and Maine.

Uses 
The fruits of the Arctic raspberry are very tasty and, among other uses, make jam and liqueur, or flavour tea. Carl von Linné considered the Arctic raspberry – åkerbär in Swedish – a great delicacy in his Flora Lapponica (1737). Also used in Smirnoff Ice and North, and Lignell & Piispanen's Mesimarjalikööri, and Wine fruit of Arctic RaspBerry (Central Arctic in Adub).

Its dark red fruit is considered a delicacy. In the Pacific Northwest of western Canada and the northwestern US, it is sometimes called the nagoon or nagoonberry, a name which derives from the Tlingit neigóon. A measure of the quality of its fruit is expressed in its Russian name княженика knyazhenika, signifying the "berry of princes".

Culture 
Arctic raspberry is the provincial plant of the Norrbotten province of northern Sweden.

See also 
 Rubus chamaemorus – Cloudberry

References

External links 
 
 photo of herbarium specimen at Missouri Botanical Garden, collected in Finland
 
 
 

Flora of the Arctic
Berries
Flora of Asia
Flora of Europe
Flora of Korea
Flora of North America
Flora of the Western United States
Holarctic flora
Plants described in 1753
Taxa named by Carl Linnaeus
arcticus